Albert James Whaling (June 22, 1888 – January 7, 1965) was an American professional baseball player. Whaling batted and threw right-handed.

Baseball career
In August 1911, he was signed by the Cleveland Naps of the American League, but did not play at the major league level. In April , Whaling was released by the Naps and returned to play for the Seattle Giants where, he posted a .264 batting average and hit 10 home runs. Whaling's defensive skills were made evident as he threw out 188 baserunners attempting to steal a base during the 1912 season. During the deadball era, catchers played a huge defensive role, given the large number of bunts and stolen base attempts, as well as the difficulty of handling the spitball pitchers who dominated pitching staffs. A newspaper report in 1912 called Whaling the best catcher to have ever played in the Northwestern League.

Whaling signed a contract to play for the Boston Braves in October 1912, and made his major league debut with the team on April 22, 1913 at the age of 25. He posted a .242 batting average in 79 games while sharing starting catching duties with Bill Rariden. Whaling had a .990 fielding percentage that year, becoming the first rookie catcher in major league baseball history to win a fielding title. Only four other rookie catchers in Major League Baseball history have accomplished the feat.

Before the 1914 season began, Rariden left the Braves to join the Federal League leaving Whaling as their main catcher with Hank Gowdy as his back up. When Whaling failed to provide much offense, Braves manager, George Stallings gave Gowdy the starting catcher's job. The Braves had been in last place in the National League on July 4 before going on an extended winning streak. The team went from last place to first place within a two-month period, becoming the first team to win a pennant after being in last place on the Fourth of July. Whaling hit .206 in 60 games as Gowdy's back up and led National League catchers in baserunners caught stealing percentage with 54.5%. The Braves went on to sweep Connie Mack's heavily favored Philadelphia Athletics in four games in the 1914 World Series, although Whaling never got a chance to play in the series. The team became known as the "Miracle" Braves and remain one of the most storied comeback teams in baseball history.

While he was a weak hitter and a slow runner, Whaling developed a reputation as a fine defensive catcher. In his final major league season, 1915, Whaling hit .221 in 72 games (42 at-bats), once again as the back up to Gowdy. He appeared in his final major league game on October 7, 1915. It was reported that there was friction between Whaling and the Braves management and, on October 13, he was traded with Herbie Moran to the Pacific Coast League's Vernon Tigers for Joe Wilhoit. After threatening to join the outlaw Federal League, Whaling signed with the Tigers in December 1915.

Whaling played with the Vernon Tigers for two seasons before joining the United States Navy during World War I. After his discharge from military service, Whaling then became a journeyman baseball player. In , he signed to play for the Great Falls Electrics however, two months later he was reported to be playing in Arizona for the Copper Queen Mine baseball team. In May , he was signed as a player for the Regina club. He played his final season as a player-manager for the Salt Lake City Bees in  before ending his playing career at the age of 38.

Career statistics
In a three-year major league career, Whaling played in 211 games, accumulating 129 hits in 573 at bats for a .225 career batting average along with 0 home runs, 50 runs batted in and an on-base percentage of .283. He scored 50 runs while walking 39 times and had 98 strikeouts. His .986 career fielding average was 15 points higher than the league average over the span of his playing career. Whaling also spent twelve seasons in the minor leagues, hitting .245 in 793 games.

Minor league manager

Whaling died in Los Angeles, California on January 21,  and was interred at Los Angeles National Cemetery.

References

External links

1888 births
1965 deaths
Baseball players from Los Angeles
Boston Braves players
Portland Beavers players
Seattle Turks players
Seattle Giants players
Vernon Tigers players
Great Falls Electrics players
Regina Senators players
Beaumont Exporters players
Edmonton Eskimos (baseball) players
Des Moines Boosters players
Denver Bears players
Salt Lake City Bees players
Minor league baseball managers
Baseball player-managers
United States Navy personnel of World War I